Antoon Arnold Marie "Teun" Struycken  (27 December 1906 – 1 December 1977) was a Dutch jurist and politician, co-founder of the Catholic People's Party (KVP) – now merged into the Christian Democratic Appeal (CDA).

Struycken worked as a lawyer in Breda from 1932 until 1939 and served as an Alderman in Breda from 1939 until 1941. Struycken worked as a jurist for the Algemene Kunstzijde Unie from 1941 until 1942. On 4 May 1942 Struycken was arrested and detained in the ilag of Sint-Michielsgestel and was released on 21 January 1944. Following the end of World War II Struycken returned as Alderman in Breda from 1945 until 1950. Struycken was appointed as Minister of Justice in the Cabinet Drees–Van Schaik following the resignation of René Wijers, taking office on 10 July 1950. The Cabinet Drees–Van Schaik fell on 24 January 1951 and continued to serve in a demissionary capacity. Following the cabinet formation of 1951, after which the Cabinet Drees–Van Schaik was replaced by the Cabinet Drees I on 15 March, Struycken was not given a ministerial post in the new cabinet. In March 1951 Struycken was appointed Governor of the Netherlands Antilles, taking office on 30 March 1951. After the election of 1956 Struycken was appointed as Deputy Prime Minister and Minister of the Interior, Property and Public Sector Organisations in the Cabinet Drees III, taking office on 29 October 1956. The Cabinet Drees III fell on 11 December 1958 after the Catholic People's Party and the Labour Party (PvdA) disagreed on a proposed Tax increase and continued to serve in a demissionary capacity until it was replaced by caretaker Cabinet Beel II with Struycken continuing as Deputy Prime Minister and Minister of the Interior, Property and Public Sector Organisations and also took over as Minister of Justice, taking office on 22 December 1958. In January 1959 Struycken announced that he would not stand for the election of 1959. Following the cabinet formation of 1959, after which the Cabinet Beel II was replaced by the Cabinet De Quay on 19 May, Struycken was not given a ministerial post in the new cabinet. In October 1959 he was nominated as Member of the Council of State, taking office on 1 November 1959. The Cabinet Cals fell on 14 October 1966 after the Night of Schmelzer and continued to serve in a demissionary capacity until it was replaced by the caretaker Cabinet Zijlstra with Struycken again appointed as Minister of Justice, taking office on 22 November 1966.

Biography

Early life
Antoon Arnold Marie Struycken was born on 27 December 1906 in Breda in the Province of North Brabant in a Roman Catholic family. Struycken was interred in the Sint-Michielsgestel prison camp during the Second World War.

Politics
He was among others Minister of Justice, Governor of the Netherlands Antilles, Minister of the Interior and a member of the Dutch Council of State. He was also alderman of Breda from 1938 to 1941, and from 1944 to 1950. After the war he was briefly Minister of Justice, in which capacity he commuted the death sentences of "" (Ferdinand aus der Fünten, Joseph Kotalla, and Willy Lages) to life imprisonment.

Governor of the Netherlands Antilles
While Governor of the Netherlands Antilles, Struycken came into conflict with the Council of Ministers of the Netherlands Antilles, who wanted to install S.W. van der Meer as Minister of Justice. Van der Meer, who had his own law practice in Curaçao, did not agree to give up his practice as a lawyer completely, prompting Struycken to refuse to install Van der Meer. The Dutch Antillean government complained to the government of the Kingdom of the Netherlands about the governor's inappropriate involvement in government matters. The Netherlands government eventually agreed with the Antillean government. This affair resulted in a reorientation of the office of Governor of the Netherlands Antilles, which increasingly began to resemble the role of the constitutional monarch in the Netherlands.

Decorations

Bibliography

References

External links

  Mr. A.A.M. (Teun) Struycken Parlement & Politiek

1906 births
1977 deaths
Aldermen in North Brabant
People from Breda
Catholic People's Party politicians
Deputy Prime Ministers of the Netherlands
Dutch nonprofit directors
Dutch nonprofit executives
Dutch Roman Catholics
Dutch political party founders
Dutch people of World War II
Dutch prisoners of war in World War II
Governors of the Netherlands Antilles
Grand Officers of the Order of Orange-Nassau
Knights of the Order of the Netherlands Lion
Ministers of Justice of the Netherlands
Ministers of the Interior of the Netherlands
Members of the Council of State (Netherlands)
Members of the Provincial Council of North Brabant
Municipal councillors of Breda
People from Nijmegen
Radboud University Nijmegen alumni
Roman Catholic State Party politicians
World War II civilian prisoners
World War II prisoners of war held by Germany
20th-century Dutch civil servants
20th-century Dutch jurists
20th-century Dutch lawyers
20th-century Dutch politicians